Ballston–MU is a side-platformed Washington Metro station in Arlington County, Virginia. The station opened on December 1, 1979, and is operated by the Washington Metropolitan Area Transit Authority (WMATA). The station is part of the Orange and Silver Lines and serves the transit-oriented community of Ballston, Ballston Quarter, and Marymount University (MU). 

Ballston–MU is also a major Metrobus transfer station. The station entrance is located at North Fairfax Drive and North Stuart Street, near the intersection of Wilson Boulevard and North Glebe Road. West of this station, the tracks rise above ground inside the median of Interstate 66.

History 
Originally to be called Glebe Road, the station was renamed Ballston by the Metro board in March 1977. After several years of construction, the station opened on December 1, 1979, as the western terminus of the Orange Line. Ballston would serve as the western terminus of the Orange Line from its opening through the opening of its extension to the Vienna station on June 7, 1986. The station remains as the final underground station for westbound travelers since its completion.

Known simply as Ballston since its opening, in December 1995 the Metro board voted unanimously to rename the station Ballston–MU, with the "MU" standing for the adjacent Marymount University. The $85,000 required for the change was paid for by Arlington County.

In September 2013, the Arlington County Board approved a funding plan for the county's share of revenue generated by Virginia's new transportation legislation. The plan calls for $500,000 to be allocated to planning for a new western entrance to the Ballston–MU station located at the intersection of N. Fairfax and Vermont Streets. The funding request would suggest that the entrance could be built by 2018.

The station was the western terminus for Orange Line trains due to Platform Reconstructions at stations west of Ballston. On August 16, 2020, all Orange Line trains were extended to West Falls Church station when it reopened bypassing East Falls Church station.

Station layout

References

External links 
 

 The Schumin Web Transit Center: Ballston–MU Station
 Stuart Street entrance from Google Maps Street View

1979 establishments in Virginia
Bus stations in Virginia
Railway stations in the United States opened in 1979
Railway stations in Virginia at university and college campuses
Stations on the Orange Line (Washington Metro)
Stations on the Silver Line (Washington Metro)
Transportation in Arlington County, Virginia
Washington Metro stations in Virginia